The Roman Catholic Diocese of Sangmélima is a diocese located in the city of Sangmélima in the Ecclesiastical province of Yaoundé in Cameroon.

History
 January 18, 1963: Established as Diocese of Sangmélima from the Diocese of Douala

Leadership
 Bishops of Sangmélima (Roman rite), in reverse chronological order
 Bishop Christophe Zoa (December 4, 2008 - present), formerly auxiliary bishop of the archdiocese of Yaounde 
 Bishop Raphaël Marie Ze (January 23, 1992  – December 4, 2008)
 Bishop Jean-Baptiste Ama (July 22, 1983  – May 20, 1991), appointed Bishop of Ebolowa-Kribi
 Bishop Pierre-Célestin Nkou (January 18, 1963  – May 16, 1983)

See also
Roman Catholicism in Cameroon

Sources
 GCatholic.org

Sangmelima
Christian organizations established in 1963
Roman Catholic dioceses and prelatures established in the 20th century
Roman Catholic Ecclesiastical Province of Yaoundé